Negation is a connective in logic and an operation computing that maps true to false and false to true.

Negation may also refer to:

 Negation (linguistics), a grammatical operation by which a proposition is replaced by one that states the opposite, as by the addition of not
 Negation (comics), a CrossGen comic
 The Negation, a 2004 album by the Polish metal band Decapitated
 Negationism, an illegitimate historical revisionist process that minimizes, denies or ignores essential facts
 Negation (poem), a 1918 poem by Wallace Stevens

Mathematics 
 Negation proper, in various logical and algebraic structures
 Additive inverse, the operation in mathematics that maps positive numbers to negative numbers and vice versa, also known as sign change and opposite number
 Negative number
 Minus sign

See also
 Negative (disambiguation)